Boris Goldstein (Busya Goldshtein; 25 December 1922 – 8 November 1987) was a Soviet violinist whose career was greatly hindered by the political situation in the USSR. As a young prodigy, he started violin studies in Odessa with the eminent pedagogue, Pyotr Stolyarsky and continued them in Moscow Conservatory under Abram Yampolsky and Lev Tseitlin.  As a teenager, Boris Goldstein was singled out by Heifetz as being  USSR's most brilliant violin talent.  His brother was the violinist and composer Mikhail Goldstein. His great uncle was the physicist Eugen Goldstein.

Life and career
Goldstein was born in Odessa in 1922, the son of Emanuel Goldstein from Leipzig, Germany, who moved to Odessa to become a professor for mathematics in Odessa.

He won the fourth prize of the 1935 Henryk Wieniawski Violin Competition in Warsaw; Ginette Neveu from France came first, David Oistrakh second, and Josef Hassid from Poland received an honorary diploma.

In 1937, at one of the most prestigious international competitions of its time, the   International Ysaye Competition, Stolyarsky students caused a sensation. Top prizes were won by David Oistrakh,  Boris Goldshtein (Goldstein), Yelizaveta Gilels and Mikhail Fikhtengoltz. 
"The results of the sessions created a profound impression: the Soviet school, with an assurance that bordered on arrogance, carried off all the prizes from the first down. The latter was awarded without the slightest discussion to the great David Oistrakh. Everyone else had to be content with crumbs; the Belgian violin school, though still a source of pride, failed, and its absence at the final was much commented on; Arthur Grumiaux and Carlo Van Neste, both young and inexperienced, were not able to convince the jury."

Later he was forced to emigrate from Russia to Germany, he taught but his solo career never recovered.

The composer, violinist, and professor for violin Mikhail Goldstein was his brother. Notable students of Boris Goldstein include Zakhar Bron and Alexander Skwortsow.

Goldstein died on 8 November 1987 in Hanover, Germany.

External links

 Boris Goldstein  plays 1st mvt.  Karol Szymanowski Sonata-audio only
Boris Goldstein plays Aria by Bertold Hummel 1978
 The Queen Elisabeth Competition
Boris Goldstein "A Virtuosos Fate" in Russian

References

 Roth, Henry (1997). Violin Virtuosos: From Paganini to the 21st Century. Los Angeles, CA: California Classics Books. 
В сб.: Музыкальное исполнительство, в. 6, М., 1970, с. 162—193;  - Гринберг М., Пронин В., В классе П. С. Столярского 
«Советская музыка», 1972, № 3. - Ойстрах Д., Фурер С., Мордкович Л., О нашем учителе. (К столетию П. С. Столярского)

1922 births
1987 deaths
Musicians from Odesa
Odesa Jews
Ukrainian classical violinists
Soviet classical violinists
Male classical violinists
Prize-winners of the Queen Elisabeth Competition
20th-century classical violinists
20th-century male musicians